With My Own Two Wheels is a 2010 film by brothers Jacob and Isaac Seigel-Boettner about the transformational power of bicycles.  It was screened at the Mountainfilm Festival in Telluride, Colorado.

Synopsis
It focuses on five individuals from around the world: Fred, a caregiver from Zambia who rides from village to village visiting AIDS patients; Carlos in Guatemala, who invented a pedal-powered device that offers a small-scale alternative to diesel-fueled machines; Sharkey, who avoids gang life by working in a Santa Barbara, California neighborhood bike shop; Bharati, a young girl in India who gets an education because she has a bicycle to ride to school; and Mirriam, a bike mechanic in Ghana stricken with Polio.

Awards
Official Selection - San Luis Obispo International Film Festival
Official Selection - Santa Barbara International Film Festival
Nominee – 2011 Fund for Santa Barbara Social Justice in Documentary Film Award
Winner - Judith Lee Stronach Baccalaureate Prize – UC Berkeley

See also
Bikes Not Bombs
Pedaling to Freedom
World Bicycle Relief

References

External links

www.withmyowntwowheels.org

2010 films
2010 documentary films
American sports documentary films
Documentary films about cycling
Films shot in Zambia
Films shot in Guatemala
Films shot in California
Films shot in India
Films shot in Ghana
Films set in Zambia
Films set in Guatemala
Films set in Santa Barbara, California
Films set in India
Films set in Ghana
2010s American films